Muchhal Mahavir temple is a Jain temple dedicated to Lord Mahavir, at Ghanerao, in Pali district in Rajasthan state in India. The place is on the route from Falna to Kumbhalgarh. The fair is held here every year on the thirteenth day of the month of Chaitra. 

Muchhal Mahavir temple along with Ranakpur, Narlai, Nadol and Varkana forms "Gorwad Panch Tirth".

Jain legend 
According to Jain legends, Rana Raj Singh I of Mewar once visited this temple to offer prayer. He noticed a white hair while putting saffron to the idol. Upon question about the hair, the temple priest replied that the hair was from the moustaches of Lord Mahavira. Following, this Rana insisted to see moustache. The temple priest fasted for three days and pleased with this the protecting deity showed moustache on the face of the idol. When Rana uprooted the moustache, blood oozed out of the spot. Following this Rana became a staunch devoutee of the Mahavira and the idol was named Mucchal Mahavir, or the Mahavir who had a moustache.

Architecture 
The temple is built in Nagara architecture. The temple is a curviliean superstructure decorated with multiple turrets and decorated pillars. The entrance of the temple has an intricately carved torana and outside the door of the temple are two large black colored idols of elephant on each side. The temple is famous for detailed cavings. The temple also has a dharamshala equipped with all modern facilities and bhojnalaya.

See also 
 Ranakpur Jain temple
 Dilwara temples

References

Citation

Source 
  
  
 

Jain temples in Rajasthan
Tourist attractions in Pali district
10th-century Jain temples